Íñigo Cervantes Huegun García (born 30 November 1989 in Hondarribia, Gipuzkoa) is a Spanish professional tennis player.

He defeated Dmitry Tursunov at the 2014 ATP 500 Barcelona, Federico Delbonis at the 2016 ATP 250 Sao Paulo, and Alexander Zverev at the 2016 German Open.

He is the son of professional footballer Manuel Cervantes.

ATP career finals

Doubles: 1 (1 runner-up)

Singles performance timeline

This table is current through the 2021 Australian Open.

Notes
1 Pospisil's 2014 Australian Open withdrawal in the third round does not count as a loss.

ATP Challenger and Futures Finals

Singles 22 (12-10)

Doubles 25 (16-9)

Notes

References

External links

1989 births
Living people
People from Hondarribia
Spanish male tennis players
Sportspeople from Gipuzkoa
Tennis players from the Basque Country (autonomous community)